Ezra Fleischer (7 August 1928 – 25 July 2006) was a Romanian-Israeli Hebrew-language poet and philologist.

Biography 
Fleischer was born in 1928 in Timișoara, in the Banat region of western Romania, and studied in the Jewish school that his father, Judah Loeb Fleischer, had founded in 1918.

After World War II, Fleischer was active in the Bnei Akiva movement in Romania and was imprisoned for his Zionist activities. While in prison, he wrote an epic Hebrew poem, “Massa Gog,” in which he predicted the downfall of Communism. The poem was smuggled out of Romania and was published in Israel, under a pen name, where it caused somewhat of a “literary sensation”. Further books of poetry followed in Romania, all under a pen name.

In 1960, Fleischer emigrated to Israel, where he researched medieval Hebrew literature. He received a doctorate from the Hebrew University of Jerusalem, where he also subsequently lectured until 1997.

He was also the director of the Geniza Research Institute for Hebrew Poetry of the Israel Academy of Sciences and Humanities. His student Shulamit Elizur has succeeded him in this position.

His published work, most of it on poetry and prayer, covers a wide range of ancient and medieval Jewish life from Andalusia and Amsterdam to Syria and Cairo. He also wrote extensively about Judaism's encounter with Islam and Christianity. At the beginning of his career in 1966, Fleischer published a comprehensive and profound critique on Menahem Zulai's book, The paytanic school of Rav Saadia Gaon, wherein Zulai had brought together and summarized his research on  Rabbi Saadia Gaon. According to Professor Yosef Tobi, Fleischer occasionally found that there exists a direct influence from Saadia upon Spanish works, such as the integration of philosophical ideas in the liturgical poems composed by Joseph ibn Abitur and Solomon ibn Gabirol, the structure of the Spanish azharot and keter malkhut of Ibn Gabirol, the assignment of biblical verse as a linguistic model in poetry and alternate rhyming (abab). However, in all these assertive statements, there is still some ambivalence and uncertainty, seeing that Fleischer is careful to point out that “the secular Hebrew poetry of Spain is not a continuation of pre-Spanish secular poetry, but rather a new formation in terms of its virtues and character: a faithful reflection, in principle, of Arabic secular poetry.”

Awards 
 In 1959, Fleischer was awarded the Israel Prize, for literature, primarily for his poem “Massa Gog”.
 In 1986, Fleischer was awarded the Bialik Prize for Jewish thought.
 In 1992, he was awarded the Rothschild Prize, for Jewish studies.

Festschriften

Ezra Fleischer Memorial Volume, ed. Shulamit Elizur [=Kobez Al Yad, vol. 25 (XXXV)] (Jerusalem: Mekizei Nirdamim, 2017; Hebrew)
In Memory of Ezra Fleischer, ed. Mordechai Akiva Friedman (Jerusalem: Israel Academy of Sciences and Humanities, 2010; Hebrew)
Knesset Ezra: Literature and Life in the Synagogue – Studies Presented to Ezra Fleischer, eds. Shulamit Elizur, Moshe David Herr, Gershon Shaked, and Avigdor Shinan (Jerusalem: Ben-Zvi, 1994; Hebrew)

See also 
List of Israel Prize recipients
List of Bialik Prize recipients

Further reading
 Hoffman, Adina & Cole, Peter (2011) Sacred Trash: The lost and found world of the Cairo Geniza

References

External links 
 Hebrew University of Jerusalem - Ezra Fleischer
 Publications at academia.edu

1928 births
2006 deaths
Judaic scholars
Hebrew-language poets
Israeli poets
Romanian male poets
Israel Prize in literature recipients
Members of the Israel Academy of Sciences and Humanities
Academic staff of the Hebrew University of Jerusalem
Hebrew University of Jerusalem alumni
Israeli Jews
Romanian Jews
Romanian dissidents
Romanian emigrants to Israel
Writers from Timișoara
20th-century Romanian poets
20th-century  Israeli historians
20th-century Romanian male writers